George Bell Chicken VC (2 March 1833 – May 1860) was a British sailor and a recipient of the Victoria Cross, the highest award for gallantry in the face of the enemy that can be awarded to British and Commonwealth forces. He was one of only five civilians to be awarded the VC, and was awarded the medal for actions while serving ashore as a volunteer in the Indian Naval Brigade during the Indian Mutiny in 1858. In 1860, he returned to sea, and died while in command of schooner Emily which was lost in a storm in the Bay of Bengal.

Early life and Victoria Cross
Chicken was born on either 2 or 6 March 1833 at either Howdon Pans, Wallsend, Northumberland, or Bishopswearmouth, Durham. He was the son of George Chicken and his wife, Elizabeth (née Bell).  During the Indian Mutiny, Chicken volunteered for service as a civilian, and on 31 July 1858, he was taken on strength at HMS Calcutta. As an acting-master, he served several months at Fort William, India, before being assigned to No. 3 Detachment of the Indian Naval Brigade. He deployed with them to Jagdispur, in Bengal, to provide artillery support.

He was 25 years old when fighting in the action that resulted in his being awarded the VC. On 27 September 1858, at Suhejnee (Sahejani), near Peroo, Bengal, Chicken was attached to a party of cavalry from the Bengal Military Police Battalion, commanded by Lieutenant Charles George Baker, and accompanied by a detachment of the 3rd Sikh Irregular Cavalry commanded by Lieutenant William Edward Delves Broughton. They routed a force of about 700 mutineers and in the pursuit which followed, Chicken forged ahead and charged into the middle of about 20 mutineers, killing five before he was forced off his horse and injured, sustaining severe wounds to his left wrist and left shoulder joints. He would have been killed if four of his fellow troopers had not arrived and rescued him. 

Lieutenant Baker wrote the following about Chicken's conduct in a despatch to Captain Gordon, Field Adjutant, Lieutenant Colonel Turner's Field Force:

A note was attached from Captain Rattray, commanding officer of the Bengal Military Police Battalion that included the following:

This note was forwarded to Lieutenant-Colonel W. W. Turner, Commander of the Troops on the Grand Trunk Road, who attached the following about Mr. Chicken:

When this note reached the Commander-in-Chief of the Army in India, Lord Clyde, the following was included in a note sent to the Governor-General Lord Canning:

His citation in the London Gazette reads:

Further information
Chicken was one of only five civilians to be awarded the VC. His VC is described as "the only Naval VC to be won on horse-back".

After the action at Suhejnee, Chicken served in the naval brigade for another two years. He was lost at sea in May 1860 when his schooner Emily was reportedly lost with all hands in the Bay of Bengal during bad weather.

The medal
The VC was originally sent to India for presentation to Chicken; however, he died before it could be bestowed upon him and the medal subsequently went missing. As a result, another medal was struck and was sent to his father, a master mariner of Shadwell, on 4 March 1862. The VC and other items came up for sale in Canada in 1987. 

In 2006, the medal – believed to be the original that was sent to India, and not the one sent to the recipient's father – was purchased by Lord Ashcroft. It is displayed as part of the collection in the Lord Ashcroft Gallery at the Imperial War Museum, London.

References

Bibliography

External links
 George Bell Chicken, V.C. (1833–1860) (biography & research information)
 
 Supplement to The London Gazette, January 31st 1859 (Casualty Roll)

1833 births
1860 deaths
British recipients of the Victoria Cross
Indian Rebellion of 1857 recipients of the Victoria Cross
Deaths due to shipwreck at sea
People from Wallsend